Carlotta Sofia Montanari is an Italian film actress and former TV host. She has appeared in the films The Mason Brothers and Being American, and on television in Parenthood and American Crime Story.

Work 

Montanari has made a number of appearances on television in Italy. She has contributed to the website LiberaMente.

She has read an audiobook, The Malice Of Fortune by Michael Ennis, and voiced a language-learning video for children.

Filmography

Television

Hosting

 Talent Uno music show (2007) - Italia 1, Italy
 Charity LIVE Show "Note D'Incanto" (2007) - Rai 1, Italy
 Charity Show LIVE "Stelle E Note Di Natale" second edition (2006) - Rai 2, Italy
 Game Show LIVE "Quizissimo"  (47 total), (2005) – Italia 7 Gold, Italy
 Charity Show LIVE "Stelle E Note Di Natale" (2003) - Rai 1, Italy
 RaiLife LIVE show (7 total) 2003) - Rai 1, Italy

References

External links
 
 Official Website

Living people
Italian television actresses
Italian voice actresses
20th-century Italian actresses
1981 births